The 1999 Salem Open was a men's tennis tournament played on Hard courts in Hong Kong that was part of the International Series of the 1999 ATP Tour. It was the twenty-fourth edition of the tournament and was held from 5 April – 12 April.

Seeds
Champion seeds are indicated in bold text while text in italics indicates the round in which those seeds were eliminated.

Draw

Finals

References

Doubles
Hong Kong Open (tennis)